My Bromance (Thai title: " My Bromance", Phi Chai My Bromance), is a 2014 Thai movie starring Teerapat Lohanan and Pongsatorn Sripinta. The movie's director is Nitchapoom Chaianun. The film was filmed in 2013 and premiered on February 20, 2014. The movie was categorized as Drama and was filmed primarily in Chiang Mai, Thailand.

The show main sponsors are: Chang's Drinking Water, Holiday Inn Chiang Mai, Paradise Clinic and The Greenery Villa.

On 13 December 2014, it was revealed that the show production is undergoing filming on a new sequel named: My Bromance: The Series. The sequel was later changed to a short story named My Bromance: Reunion. During mid of 2016, it was announced that My Bromance: The Series has started filming, with completely new casts.

In early September 2017, Wayufilm teased that they will soon be filming My Bromance 2 and it will premiere in 2018. Teerapat Lohanan and Pongsatorn Sripinta will return to reprise their roles as Golf and Bank respectively.

Synopsis
"Golf" lives in a large house, but a broken home. His father is often away on business, and his unmarried aunt is unhappy. He resents the loss of his mother, and is aggressive and hot-tempered, deprived of his father's attention. A new wife arrives with a teenage son, a few months younger than "Golf". "Bank", on the other hand, is gentle, considerate and sweet-natured, and hopes his new family will accept him. But his arrival is resented by his new brother. Before they accept each other as "Brothers", they must learn the art of living together, to overcome the obstacles of their surroundings, and gradually fall in love.

Story Synopsis
Golf (played by Teerapat Lohanan) whom is referred by his friends as aggressive, hot-tempered, a playboy and foul-mouth 18-year-old high school student. He comes from a broken family, often living in the semi-detached home alone, often depriving the love and attention from his father, but the latter showered him with money.

One day, Golf was thrown in a ruthless world of family politics when Golf's father brought a woman (Thara) and Bank (played by Pongsatorn Sripinta) home, confused as it is, Golf slowly learns that, that Thara would be his new step-mother, and also had to learn that he has a step-brother who is just 4 months his junior. Golf, who has never been an older brother and doesn't wish to have a younger brother was forced to accept the sudden change with new additions in the family. Golf began to ostracized Bank when he tries to make contact with the new older brother.

Soon after, initially belonging to another class, Bank asked the school principal to transfer him to Golf's class to be close to him, Golf's chanced the opportunity on Bank by bullying him. as he hates to see him, taking any opportunity that comes his way, resulting dampening the relationship with his friends (especially Jieb). And the concerned group of classmates of theirs stepped in, making Golf's in realizing what he did to Bank was wrong, When the jealous Golf discovers that Bank who is willing to do anything and everything for his older brother. Bank's actions slowly earn and won the respect of Golf, and slowly accepts him as brother. However, love starts to dazzle and blossom in the two unknown brothers.

Things gets sticky when Thom (played by Withawat Thaokhamlue) a popular school singer tries his ways to woo Bank, by sending him lunchbox, flowers and snacks. Also, he went as far as to buying Bank's contact number from Bank's classmate and friend (Tar), knowing his family is poor. Affected by what Golf's saw in his own eyes, that Bank communicated with Thom, he turned jealous, and started a heated argument with Bank, and end up forcing Bank to confess his true feelings for his older brother. Golf later confessed his true feelings too and in return, gave Bank a couple ring which Bank wanted to buy earlier on.

Things does not look so good as it seems, apart from having the approval by their classmates (Jieb, Paan, Tar and Tued), the duo relationship start to crack when Golf's aunt suspected and eventually caught the audacious act by the two step-brothers laying on top of each other as they return home from a trip. Horrified and notified by the action, Golf's father called for a family meeting and eventually sent Golf to America to study, in hopes that the two brother's relationship will break, leaving both boys sad and withered like flowers.

Six months has passed, Golf returned home, a happy Bank was shocked and couldn't accept that his older brother has a new girlfriend (Kaem) whom they knew in America, and to make matters worst, Golf is about to get engaged to Kaem, leaving a heart-broken Bank to date Thom, however Bank's steadfast love for Golf did not change. Being confronted by Golf's firm love to Bank and in the state of a heated argument proving who loves who, both brothers was involved in a car accident leaving the two brothers seriously injured.

A shocked Golf slowly understands that his brother life was left hanging when the doctors had to remove one of his kidneys, and the latter's health did not improve, as Bank's other kidney did not function properly, a sad Golf decides to donate his kidney to Bank, with several disapproval from his father. After pleading, Golf eventually donates his kidney to his younger brother, a pact they have done before that none of the brothers will leave each other.

Fast forward to one year later, during Bank's 19th birthday, unbeknownst to Bank about his brother Golf's death. Bank unwraps the last present and a letter given to him, but was left in tears when he learnt that his brother had died of a brain tumor (a condition that was discovered after the duo had the car accident), and the truth that Golf has donated one of the kidneys to Bank, telling him his love to his younger brother, leaving Bank even more distraught.

As Bank visited Golf's grave, he thanked the older brother and offered the ring to him, with his finger wearing one, proving Bank's everlasting and steadfast love to his brother. To a boy who has suffered so much, Bank took on his brother legacy by doing what he likes most, painting and collecting plastic toy fixtures. (To the viewers, it was shown that Bank's mother had born a son). And Bank fully understands and is able to with-hold the love of his older brother, Bank later affirmed the love of his brother by visiting a bridge area which the brothers frequently visited.

Cast

Main Cast

Supporting cast

References

External links

My Bromance Official website

2014 films
Wayufilm films
2014 LGBT-related films
Thai LGBT-related films